In organic chemistry, the Knoevenagel condensation reaction is a type of chemical reaction named after German chemist Emil Knoevenagel. It is a modification of the aldol condensation.

A Knoevenagel condensation is a nucleophilic addition of an active hydrogen compound to a carbonyl group followed by a dehydration reaction in which a molecule of water is eliminated (hence condensation). The product is often an α,β-unsaturated ketone (a conjugated enone).

In this reaction the carbonyl group is an aldehyde or a ketone. The catalyst is usually a weakly basic amine. The active hydrogen component has the form

 , for instance nitromethane.

where Z is an electron withdrawing group. Z must be powerful enough to facilitate deprotonation to the enolate ion even with a mild base. Using a strong base in this reaction would induce self-condensation of the aldehyde or ketone.

The Hantzsch pyridine synthesis, the Gewald reaction and the Feist–Benary furan synthesis all contain a Knoevenagel reaction step. The reaction also led to the discovery of CS gas.

Doebner modification

When one of the withdrawing groups on the nucleophile is a carboxylic acid, for example, with malonic acid, the condensation product can undergo a decarboxylation process in a subsequent step. In the so-called Doebner modification the base is pyridine. For example, the reaction product of acrolein and malonic acid in pyridine is trans-2,4-Pentadienoic acid with one carboxylic acid group and not two.

Scope 
A Knoevenagel condensation is demonstrated in the reaction of 2-methoxybenzaldehyde 1 with the thiobarbituric acid 2 in ethanol using piperidine as a base. The resulting enone 3 is a charge transfer complex molecule.

The Knoevenagel condensation is a key step in the commercial production of the antimalarial drug lumefantrine (a component of Coartem):

The initial reaction product is a 50:50 mixture of E and Z isomers but because both isomers equilibrate rapidly around their common hydroxyl precursor, the more stable Z-isomer can eventually be obtained.

A multicomponent reaction featuring a Knoevenagel condensation is demonstrated in this MORE synthesis with cyclohexanone, malononitrile and 3-amino-1,2,4-triazole:

Weiss–Cook reaction
The Weiss–Cook reaction consists in the synthesis of cis-bicyclo[3.3.0]octane-3,7-dione employing an acetonedicarboxylic acid ester and a diacyl (1,2 ketone). The mechanism operates in the same way as the Knoevenagel condensation:

See also
 Malonic ester synthesis
 Aldol condensation
 Nitroalkene
 Iminocoumarin

References 

Condensation reactions
Name reactions
Carbon-carbon bond forming reactions